Lorenzo G. Vidino is an Italian-American writer on Islamism in Europe and North America. He was born in Milan, Italy. He holds a law degree from the University of Milan and a Ph.D. from the Fletcher School of Law and Diplomacy.

Career
Vidino was a fellow at Harvard University's Belfer Center in 2009–10 and Jennings Randolph Peace Scholar at the US Institute of Peace the same year. In 20110–11, he was a visiting fellow at the RAND Corporation in Washington, DC, before joining ETH Zurich. He has also held fellowships at the Fletcher School at Tufts University.

In 2014, he was a policy adviser at European Foundation for Democracy. 
In June 2015, Vidino was chosen to head the George Washington University Center for Cyber and Homeland Security's Program on Extremism. 

In 2016–17, Vidino coordinated Italy's National Commission on Jihadist Radicalization, appointed by then-prime minister Matteo Renzi.

He advises the Austrian Documentation Center for Political Islam, an organization that co-published the highly disputed "Islam map", an overview of locations and affiliations of more than 600 mosques and Muslim associations in Austria.

Vidino is the author of three books, a number of congressional testimonies, and frequent articles in several prominent newspapers and academic journals. His main subject is the Muslim Brotherhood, which he describes as "a modern day Trojan horse engaged in a sort of stealth subversion aimed at weakening Western society from within."

A review of his 2020 book, The Closed Circle: Joining and Leaving the Muslim Brotherhood in the West, which features interviews with six former Brotherhood members in Western countries, noted the "misplaced" suspicion Vidino puts on the Brotherhood and contested his claim that the Brotherhood seeks the gradual creation of a caliphate.

The Bridge Initiative of Georgetown University published a comprehensive factsheet about Vidino in April 2020, claiming that his "research promotes conspiracy theories about the Muslim Brotherhood in Europe and the United States". The initiative's associative director, Mobashra Tazamal, stated on Twitter that Vidino's work "has been used to justify the criminalization of Muslim civil society across Europe". In the tweet, Tazamal referred to the Austrian government's use of Vidino's work to justify Operation Luxor, the largest police operation in Austria since 1945 (later declared "unlawful" by the courts), which raided the homes of nearly seventy families active in Austrian Muslim associations, including Farid Hafez, a professor at Salzburg and Georgetown who researches and publishes on Islamophobia. In response to criticism, Vidino stated in an interview with Wiener Zeitung''': "If my work is flawed and has caused you damage, why don't you sue me? It's just general criticism, personal attacks and empty legal threats: that's quite revealing to me."

Publications
 Al Qaeda in Europe: The New Battleground of International Jihad (Rowman & Littlefield, 2005)Table of Contents – Library of Congress

 The New Muslim Brotherhood in the West (2010)
 The Muslim Brotherhood in Austria (report, 2017)
 The Closed Circle: Joining and Leaving the Muslim Brotherhood in the West'' (2020)

References

External links
 Former official website on the Wayback Machine
 The New Muslim Brotherhood in the West

Living people
Writers from Milan
Italian male writers
The Fletcher School at Tufts University alumni
Elliott School of International Affairs faculty
Year of birth missing (living people)